Karen Thompson Walker is an American novelist. Her first book, The Age of Miracles was published in 2012. Walker's second novel, The Dreamers was published in 2019. Walker has been featured in Jezebel, Electric Literature, Publishers Weekly, National Public Radio, The Washington Post, The Guardian, and more.

Biography
Karen Thompson Walker was born in San Diego, California. She earned her degrees in English language and creative writing from the University of California, Los Angeles. While in college, Walker wrote for the Daily Bruin. After completing her undergraduate degree, Walker worked as a journalist for a newspaper in San Diego. She completed her master's degree at Columbia University.

After graduating from Columbia, Walker lived with her husband in Brooklyn, New York. She worked as an editor at Simon & Schuster. Today, she lives in Oregon and is an assistant professor at the University of Oregon in the Creative Writing Department.

Awards and honors
Walker was awarded the Bomb "best fiction" prize. In 2011, she was awarded a Sirenland Fellowship.

References

External links

Living people
21st-century American novelists
American women novelists
Writers from San Diego
University of California, Los Angeles alumni
Columbia University alumni
University of Oregon faculty
Writers from Oregon
American women academics
21st-century American women writers
Year of birth missing (living people)